Betula kenaica, or Kenai birch, is a species of birch that can be found in Alaska and northwestern North America at  above sea level.

Description
The leaf margins are cuneated and serrated with rounded base and acute apex. The flowers bloom in late spring while fruits fall in autumn.

Uses
The buds and twigs of the plant are used as a stew flavor while its inner bark can be eaten either raw or cooked and can be used as soup thickener. The sap is used to make honey.

References

Further reading
Betula kenaica W. H. Evans, Bot. Gaz. 27: 481. 1899

kenaica
Flora of North America